Chaudhary Jayant Singh (born 27 December 1978) is an Indian politician and a current member of the Rajya Sabha from Uttar Pradesh. He also served as member in 15th Lok Sabha from Mathura. He is the National Chairman of The Rashtriya Lok Dal Party.

Early life
He was born in Dallas, Texas, United States to Chaudhary Ajit Singh and Radhika Singh in a Jat family of the Tewatia (Teotia) clan. He originally belongs to Bhatona, Bulandshahr. He is the National President of the Rashtriya Lok Dal (RLD) and was a member of Parliament from Mathura in Uttar Pradesh state in the 15th Lok Sabha.

He graduated from Sri Venkateswara College of the Delhi University and in 2002 received a master's degree in accounting and finance from the London School of Economics and Political Science.

Career 
He started his political career as a member of parliament from Mathura, which has majority of Jat people. He was one of the prime movers on Land Acquisition issue and had introduced a Private Member Bill on Land Acquisition in the Lok Sabha. Jayant Singh Chaudhary was a member of the Standing Committee on Commerce, the Consultative Committee on Finance, the Indian Council of Agricultural Research (ICAR), and the Committee on Government Assurances. He has served previously on the Standing Committees on Agriculture and Finance as well as the Committee on Ethics.

He again contested from Mathura in 2014 Indian general election but lost his seat against BJP candidate Hema Malini.

Chaudhary called the Lakhimpur Kheri incident where 8 people died in a vehicle-ramming attack "not less than a terror attack".

Family 
Jayant is married and has two children. He is the grandson of Chaudhary Charan Singh, former prime minister of India and son of Chaudhary Ajit Singh, former union minister.

References

External links
 Jayant Singh - Facebook
 Jayant Singh - Twitter
  Official biographical sketch in Parliament of India website

Alumni of the London School of Economics
Living people
People from Mathura district
India MPs 2009–2014
Rashtriya Lok Dal politicians
1978 births
Lok Sabha members from Uttar Pradesh
People from Dallas
United Progressive Alliance candidates in the 2014 Indian general election